158 (one hundred [and] fifty-eight) is the natural number following 157 and preceding 159.

In mathematics

158 is a nontotient, since there is no integer with 158 coprimes below it. 158 is a Perrin number, appearing after 68, 90, 119.

158 is the number of digits in the decimal expansion of 100!, the product of all the natural numbers up to and including 100.

In the military
  was a United States Navy  during World War II
  was a United States Navy  during World War II
  was a United States Navy  during World War II
  was a United States Navy  following World War II
  was a United States Navy  during World War II
  was a United States Navy Trefoil-class concrete barge during World War II
  was a United States Navy  during World War II
  was a United States Navy converted yacht patrol vessel during World War I

In music
 The song 158 by the Indie-rock band Blackbud
 The song "Here We Go" (1998) from The Bouncing Souls’ Tie One On CD includes the lyrics "Me, Shal Pete and Lamar thumbed down the ramp of Exit 158"

In transportation
 The Alfa Romeo 158 racecar
 The Ferrari 158 racecar produced between 1964 and 1965
The British Rail Class 158 Express Sprinter is a diesel multiple unit (DMU) train, built for British Rail between 1989 and 1992

In other fields
158 is also:
 The year AD 158 or 158 BC
 One of a number of highways
 The atomic number of an element temporarily called unpentoctium.
 158 Koronis is a Main belt asteroid
 In the Israeli satirical comedy Operation Grandma ("Mivtza Safta", מבצע סבתא), the number 158 is implied to be a classified high-rank officer position (Alon says: "Since you've became 158, you became all that?")
 Township 158-30 is a small township in Lake of the Woods County, Minnesota
 Edenwold No. 158, Saskatchewan is a rural municipality in Saskatchewan, Canada
 John Irving's third novel, The 158-Pound Marriage
 Financial Accounting Standards Board summary of statement No. 158 requires an employer to recognize the overfunded or underfunded status of a defined benefit postretirement plan

See also
 List of highways numbered 158
 United Nations Security Council Resolution 158
 United States Supreme Court cases, Volume 158
 Pennsylvania House of Representatives, District 158
 Consolidated School District 158, Illinois
 Marie Curie Middle School 158, Bayside, New York
 P.S. 158, Manhattan, New York City

References

External links

 The Number 158

Integers